Góra  is a village in the administrative district of Gmina Miedźna, within Pszczyna County, Silesian Voivodeship, in southern Poland.

The village has a population of 2,554.

References

Villages in Pszczyna County